One Meat Brawl is a 1947 Warner Bros. Merrie Melodies cartoon directed by Robert McKimson. The short was released on January 18, 1947.

Mel Blanc voiced most of the characters including Grover Groundhog's singing voice, while newly hired Stan Freberg provided the speaking voice of Grover and also the voice of Walter Winchell emanating from the radio. Carl Stalling wrote the music, assisted by Milt Franklyn who arranged it for orchestra. The cartoon's title is a takeoff on the popular song "One Meat Ball".

Plot
In a forest dwells Grover Groundhog and today is Groundhog Day. Grover Groundhog does a dance with his shadow saying that his shadow means nothing in relation to the weather forecast. A radio broadcast prompts Grover to leave his burrow for photographers to see if his shadow appears or not. Upon leaving his burrow the cameras switch to guns (revealing the pretend photographers are hunters) and begin firing at Grover, but he manages to retreat.

Porky and his dog Mandrake are hunting for a groundhog as well. Mandrake's first searching attempt only has him retrieve a boot. While Mandrake lingers in the woods, Grover gives him a fright. Mandrake recognises Grover as a groundhog and begins chasing him (even after Grover bribes him). Grover starts scolding Mandrake and making a sad story. This makes Mandrake oppose Porky's hunting, until Porky snaps him out of it. Before resuming the chase, Porky's dons a pair of earmuffs on Mandrake, but Grover tells another sad story through a microphone into the earmuffs. As Porky scolds Mandrake, the dog pretends to commit suicide with a water pistol. Porky gives Mandrake a final chance to catch the groundhog. Grover tricks Mandrake into eating a bone so that Porky thinks he ate the groundhog. As Porky confronts Mandrake, Grover whispers a sad story to pass on to Mandrake. Mandrake snaps Porky out of his tears and Grover runs off. All three of them rush into Grover's home and their fighting is actually shown to be shadow boxing, with Porky explaining, "This way, no one gets hurt!"

Home media
 VHS - Viddy-Oh! For Kids Cartoon Festivals: Porky Pig and Daffy Duck Cartoon Festival Featuring "Tick Tock Tuckered"
 VHS - Viddy-Oh! For Kids Cartoon Festivals: Porky Pig Cartoon Festival Featuring "Tom Turk and Daffy"
 LaserDisc - The Golden Age of Looney Tunes, Volume 2, Side 6
 DVD - Looney Tunes Super Stars' Porky & Friends: Hilarious Ham (USA 1995 Turner print)

References

External links

1947 animated films
1947 short films
1947 films
Merrie Melodies short films
Warner Bros. Cartoons animated short films
Films directed by Robert McKimson
Animated films about squirrels
Films about hunters
Porky Pig films
Films scored by Carl Stalling
1940s Warner Bros. animated short films
Groundhog Day